Lorna Raver is an American retired actress who has appeared in numerous plays, films, and television series. She is sometimes credited as Lorna Raver Johnson.

Life and career
Raver was born in York, Pennsylvania, and was raised in a Pennsylvania Dutch environment. She had early experience performing at the Hedgerow Theater in Pennsylvania. She moved to New York City, appearing off-Broadway in the premieres of Last Days at the Dixie Girl Cafe and Between Daylight and Boonville. She then spent several years as a stage actress in Chicago and regionally before moving to Los Angeles, where she had many guest roles on TV and continued to work in live theater, including performances of The Seagull, Spinning into Butter, The Women, The American Plan, Oedipus Rex,  and The Drama Coach, for which she won the Drama-Logue and LA Weekly awards. She also performs in radio drama.On September 19, 2006, she began appearing as Rebecca Kaplan on CBS's The Young and the Restless. She won critical acclaim as Mrs. Ganush in Sam Raimi's Drag Me to Hell'' (2009). In addition to numerous other stage and television appearances, she is a notable audiobook narrator for Tantor, Books on Tape, and Blackstone Audio. Raver retired from acting in 2014.

Filmography

Film

References

External links
 

American film actresses
American soap opera actresses
American television actresses
Living people
People from York, Pennsylvania
American radio actresses
Actresses from Pennsylvania
21st-century American women
Year of birth missing (living people)